Gynogenesis, a form of parthenogenesis, is a system of asexual reproduction that requires the presence of sperm without the actual contribution of its DNA for completion. The paternal DNA dissolves or is destroyed before it can fuse with the egg. The egg cell of the organism is able to develop, unfertilized, into an adult using only maternal genetic material. Gynogenesis is often termed "sperm parasitism" in reference to the somewhat pointless role of male gametes. Gynogenetic species, "gynogens" for short, are unisexual, meaning they must mate with males from a closely related bisexual species that normally reproduces sexually.

Gynogenesis is a disadvantageous mating system for males, as they are unable to pass on their DNA. The question as to why this reproductive mode exists, given that it appears to combine the disadvantages of both asexual and sexual reproduction, remains unsolved in the field of evolutionary biology. The male equivalent to this process is Androgenesis where the father is the sole contributor of DNA.

Examples 

Most gynogenetic species fall into the taxonomic groups of the fishes and the amphibians.  

Amazon mollies, (Poecilia formosa) require the sperm of closely related male Poecilia latipinna to engage in gynogenesis. Research has shown that the P. latipinna males prefer to mate with females of their own species, given the previously-discussed disadvantage for males in mating with gynogens. This presents a problem for P. formosa, as they must compete for males with a preferred population. However, those P. formosa successful in finding a mate make up the deficit by producing twice as many female offspring as their competitors. 

The ant species Myrmecia impaternata is female-only, with its hybrid origin tracing back to Myrmecia banksi and Myrmecia pilosula. In ant species, sex is determined by the haplodiploidy system, where unfertilized eggs result in haploid males and fertilized eggs result in diploid females. In this species, the queen reproduces through sexual interaction, yet not fertilization, with allospecific males reared from "impaternate" (fatherless) eggs in impaternate nests.   

Ambystoma platineum, a unisexual mole salamander species, are a result of the hybridization of sexually reproducing Ambystoma jeffersonianum and A laterale. A. platineum individuals normally live in proximity to either of these parent species, due to their need to use their sperm to facilitate reproduction.

Evolutionary origin
Two evolutionary pathways may be considered to explain how and why gynogenesis evolved. The single-step pathway involves multiple changes taking place simultaneously: meiosis must be interrupted, one gender's gametes eradicated, and a unisexual gender formation must arise. The second option involves multiple steps: a sexual generation is formed with a strongly biased sex ratio, and because of Haldane's Rule the species evolves towards loss of sexuality and selection that is preferential towards the gynogen. Experimenters who attempted unsuccessfully to induce P. formosa in a laboratory by hybridizing its genetic ancestors concluded that the evolutionary origin of P. formosa was not from the simple hybridization of two specific genomes, but the movement of certain alleles at certain loci that resulted in this evolutionary change to unisexuality.

See also 
 Klepton
 Hybridogenesis in water frogs

References 

Asexual reproduction in animals
Zoology